The World Cup Stadium Station is a metropolitan subway station in Seoul, Korea. The station was built to facilitate access to the Seoul World Cup Stadium for 2002 FIFA World Cup. The station has a very specific design with a main entrance reminiscent of a Greek amphitheater, between Exits 2 and 3.

Station layout

Vicinity
Exit 1 : Seoul World Cup Stadium, Peace Park
Exit 2 : Sangam Megabox
Exit 3 :

References

Railway stations opened in 2000
Metro stations in Mapo District
Seoul Metropolitan Subway stations